This is a list of awards and nominations for Fernanda Montenegro. She was the first Latin American to be nominated for Academy Award for Best Actress in 1998 for her role in Central Station. She was also the first actress to be nominated for a Portuguese-speaking role. The performance has netted her more than two dozen prizes, including best actress awards from the National Board of Review and the Los Angeles Film Critics.

Despite her success in Central Station, Montenegro's primary interest remained the theatre. In 1999 she kept up her busy acting schedule, appearing in stage productions of plays by Anton Chekhov and Luigi Pirandello. She also continued her work on the small screen, including a turn as a manipulative stepmother in the acclaimed miniseries Today is Maria’s Day. The film The Other Side of the Street (2004), a thriller inspired by the work of director Alfred Hitchcock, featured Montenegro as a lonely woman who believes she has witnessed a murder take place across the street from her apartment building. She received a number of best actress awards for the performance, including the Tribeca Film Festival award and the Cinema Brazil Grand Prize. Montenegro again reached audiences outside her native Brazil in Love in the Time of Cholera (2007), an adaptation of Gabriel García Márquez’s 1985 novel.

In 2013, she became the first Brazilian to receive an Emmy, thanks to her renowned career in television and her prominent role in the romantic comedy Sweet Mother.

Major awards and nominations

Academy Awards

Golden Globe Awards

Berlin International Film Festival

Brazilian Film Festival of Toronto

Brasilia Film Festival

Moscow International Film Festival

Gramado Film Festival

Guadalajara International Film Festival

Havana Film Festival

International Emmy Awards

Los Angeles Film Critics Association

National Board of Review

San Sebastián International Film Festival

Satellite Awards

São Paulo Association of Art Critics

Taormina Film Fest

Tribeca Film Festival

AARP Movies for Grownups Awards

Troféu Imprensa

References

External links
 Fernanda Montenegro at the Internet Movie Database

Montenegro, Fernanda
List of awards and nominations